Spinotrachelas is a genus of South African araneomorph spiders in the family Trachelidae, first described by C. R. Haddad in 2006.

Species
 it contains five species, all found in South Africa:
Spinotrachelas capensis Haddad, 2006 (type) – South Africa
Spinotrachelas confinis Lyle, 2011 – South Africa
Spinotrachelas montanus Haddad, Neethling & Lyle, 2011 – South Africa
Spinotrachelas namaquensis Lyle, 2011 – South Africa
Spinotrachelas similis Lyle, 2011 – South Africa

References

External links

Endemic fauna of South Africa
Araneomorphae genera
Trachelidae